"Hold Me Close" is a pop song written and performed by English singer and actor David Essex.
The song was released in October 1975, and reached the number one position on the UK Singles Chart, where it remained for three weeks.

Song profile
"Hold Me Close" is a love song written by Essex and produced by Jeff Wayne. It was Essex's second and final UK chart-topper. The B-side was titled "Good Ol' Rock and Roll" (live version). The song appears on the album All The Fun Of The Fair, and is featured in the musical of that name.

Charts

Weekly charts

Year-end charts

TV usage

This song appeared at the end of ITV's Police Camera Action! in October 1995 on the episode "Tales of the Unexpected".

Essex performed the song live on Loose Women on 16 September 2008.

Football chants

"Hold Me Close" is sung by Shamrock Rovers fans in the League of Ireland as well as Alfreton Town fans in the National League North.

References

External links
Official David Essex website

David Essex songs
UK Singles Chart number-one singles
Irish Singles Chart number-one singles
1975 singles
Songs written by David Essex
1975 songs
CBS Records singles
Song recordings produced by Jeff Wayne